The Shima Tract is an island in the Sacramento–San Joaquin River Delta. It is part of San Joaquin County, California, and managed by Reclamation District 2115. It appears on a 1952 USGS map of the area.

The Shima Tract was owned by (and takes its name from) George Shima, a businessman and farmer who at one point produced 85% of California's potato crop.

References

Islands of San Joaquin County, California
Islands of the Sacramento–San Joaquin River Delta
Islands of Northern California